William Eustace Meyer (12 January 1883 – 1 October 1953) was an English cricketer.  Meyer was a right-handed batsman who bowled right-arm fast-medium.  He was born at Redland, Bristol.

Meyer made his first-class debut for Gloucestershire against Kent in the 1909 County Championship at the Private Banks Sports Ground. He made eight further first-class appearances for the county, the last of which came against Middlesex in the 1910 County Championship at Lord's. In his nine matches for Gloucestershire, he scored 136 runs at an average of 8.50, with a high score of 43.

He died at Falmouth, Cornwall, on 1 October 1953.

References

External links
William Meyer at ESPNcricinfo
William Meyer at CricketArchive

1883 births
1953 deaths
Cricketers from Bristol
English cricketers
Gloucestershire cricketers